is a passenger railway station located in the southern portion of the town of Matsuda in Ashigarakami District, Kanagawa, Japan, operated by Central Japan Railway Company (JR Central). It is also a freight depot for the Japan Freight Railway Company (JR Freight).

Lines
Matsuda Station is served by the Gotemba Line. The limited express Mt. Fuji service runs between Shinjuku in Tokyo and Gotemba via this station. Shin-Matsuda Station on the Odakyu Odawara Line is located nearby.

Station layout
Matsuda Station has an island platform and a side platform serving three tracks. The two platforms are connected with a footbridge, and an underpass connects the island platform with the station building. The station building has automated ticket machines, TOICA automated turnstiles and a "JR Ticket office" staffed ticket office.

Platforms

History
Matsuda Station opened on February 1, 1889.

Station numbering was introduced to the Gotemba Line in March 2018; Matsuda Station was assigned station number CB04.

Passenger statistics
In fiscal 2019, the station was used by an average of 3,305 passengers daily (boarding passengers only).

The passenger figures (boarding passengers only) for previous years are as shown below.

Surrounding area
Kanagawa Prefectural Ashigarakami Hospital
Matsuda Town Hall
Matsuda Town Cultural Center
 Matsuda Town Gymnasium

See also
List of railway stations in Japan

References

External links

 Station information (Gotembasen.net) 
 Matsuda Station Guide (Central Japan Railway Company) 
Jorudan Train Route Finder

Railway stations in Japan opened in 1889
Stations of Japan Freight Railway Company
Matsuda, Kanagawa